The 2017 Palarong Pambansa was the 60th edition of the Palarong Pambansa and was held from April 23 to 29, 2017 in Antique. Student athletes from 18 athletic associations representing the 18 regions of the Philippines competed in different sporting events and disciplines.

Bidding
Two provinces remained after Negros Occidental, Cebu and Iloilo backed-out of the bid to host the annual multi-sports event in 2017 due to budget difficulties, San Jose de Buenavista, Antique and Dumaguete showed interest in hosting the event and officially submitted their respective bids to the Palarong Pambansa bids and selection committee. On November 18, 2016, the Palarong Pambansa Selection Committee voted to choose the official host of the next Palarong Pambansa. San Jose de Buenavista, Antique won with 5 votes against 4 for Dumaguete and was officially declared the host of Palarong Pambansa 2017.

Plan for the games
Antique's bid includes plans to renovate and upgrade the rubberized track oval and other facilities inside the Binirayan Sports Complex in San Jose de Buenavista, which will be the main venue of the games. Several indoor sporting events will be held at the University of Antique in the town of Sibalom, St. Anthony's College in San Jose de Buenavista, and other covered courts located within the 40-kilometer radius around the capital town.

The province of Antique was awarded the rights to host the games by the DepEd Palarong Pambansa Selection Committee after it outbid Dumaguete, Negros Oriental by a single vote.

The Games was originally scheduled to be held from April 10 to 16, 2017 but was moved to April 23 to 29, 2017 due to the original schedule coinciding with Holy Week observances. This would be the first time for Antique to host the event.

Sports

Regular sports
Futsal is elevated from being a demonstration sport and will be played as a regular sports discipline for the first time. Dancesport, Pencak Silat, and Aerobic Gymnastics will be introduced as demonstration sports in the games.

Demonstration Sports
These are the seven demonstration sports for this year's Palarong Pambansa. Futsal was elevated as a regular sports discipline starting this edition of the games. Dancesport, Pencak Silat, and Aerobic Gymnastics will be introduced as demonstration sports in the games.

Special Para Games
These are the four sports with various events to be contested at this games:

 Swimming
 Bocce
 Goalball
 Athletics

Participating regions
A total of 18 athletic associations coming from 18 regions of the country will be participating in the athletic meet.

Playing Venues 
At least 31 different locations were selected as the playing venues for the 26 sports discipline of the games.:

Billeting Areas
Several public and private elementary, secondary and tertiary schools, colleges and university situated from the towns near the provincial capital San Jose de Buenavista were selected as the billeting areas for delegates and officials of the games.

Official Medal Tally

Regular Games

Demo Sports

Para Games

References

Palarong Pambansa
Palarong Pambansa
Palarong Pambansa
Sports in Antique (province)
April 2017 sports events in the Philippines